Lamar Nathaniel Thomas (born February 12, 1970 in Ocala, Florida) is a former American football Wide Receiver and current Wide Receivers coach for the Orlando Guardians of the XFL.

College career
Thomas played college football and college basketball and ran track at the University of Miami before being drafted in the third round of the 1993 NFL Draft by the Tampa Bay Buccaneers. He is a University of Miami Sports Hall of Fame inductee, class of 2014.

With the Miami Hurricanes Thomas set a then-school record for most receptions in a career (later eclipsed by Reggie Wayne). He was the victim of "The Strip", George Teague's strip of the football at the 10-yard line in the 1993 Sugar Bowl, an Alabama rout of Miami.

Thomas was interviewed about his time at the University of Miami for the documentary The U, which premiered December 12, 2009 on ESPN.

Playing career
Thomas played eight seasons in the NFL as a wide receiver, three with the Buccaneers and five with the Miami Dolphins, where he had his greatest success. In his final year of NFL play, he had 43 receptions for 603 yards and five touchdowns.  His last two seasons were spent on injured reserve (shoulder and hip).

Post-playing career
Thomas worked as a color commentator for Comcast Sports Southeast until he was fired due to his comments during an on-field brawl between the University of Miami and FIU in 2006.

From 2013 to 2015, he worked as the Louisville Cardinals wide receivers coach after working with new Louisville head coach Bobby Petrino at Western Kentucky in the same position. With the Cardinals, he helped recruit future Heisman Trophy-winning quarterback Lamar Jackson; Jackson had caught Thomas' attention at WKU. He was the wide receivers coach at the University of Kentucky from 2016 to 2018. In 2019, he served the same position with the Salt Lake Stallions of the Alliance of American Football (AAF).

Thomas was officially hired by the Orlando Guardians on September 13, 2022

Miami/FIU controversy
During an intense on-field brawl between Miami and FIU on October 14, 2006, Thomas defended his alma mater. Besides defending the Miami players, he expressed a desire to join the fight himself:

Thomas later claimed he was joking about his comments, but two days after this incident, Comcast Sports Southeast fired him.

On the October 17, 2006, episode of Fox News Channel's Hannity & Colmes, Thomas said he got caught up in the moment and made a mistake.  However, he said he did not blame Comcast for firing him.

Personal life
In July 1996, Thomas was charged with aggravated battery against a pregnant female after beating his fiancée, Ebony Cooksey. In February 1997 he pled no contest and was sentenced to eight days in jail and 18 months probation. In March 1997, he was arrested for allegedly beating Cooksey again, and charged with violating the terms of his probation. He was jailed until the May 1997 hearing.

References

1970 births
Living people
American football wide receivers
Players of American football from Florida
Sportspeople from Ocala, Florida
Miami Dolphins players
Tampa Bay Buccaneers players
Miami Hurricanes football players
College football announcers
Hampton Pirates football coaches
Louisville Cardinals football coaches
Western Kentucky Hilltoppers football coaches
Kentucky Wildcats football coaches
Salt Lake Stallions coaches